HMS Gibraltar was a member of the Gibraltar Group of 24-gun sixth rates. After commissioning she spent her career in Home waters and North America on trade protection duties. She was rebuilt at Deptford between 1725 and 1727. After her rebuild she served in Home Waters, North America, West Indies and the Mediterranean on trade protection. She was sold in 1749.

Gibraltar was the first named vessel in the Royal Navy.

Construction
She was ordered on 24 January 1711 from Deptford Dockyard to be built under the guidance of Joseph Allin, Master Shipwright of Portsmouth. She was launched on 18 October 1711.

Commissioned Service
She was commissioned in 1712 under the command of Commander John Shorter, RN (promoted to captain in January 1713) for service in Ireland for 'owling'. She under the command of Captain Edward Falkingham, RN Newfoundland convoy. Captain Beaumont Waldron, RN for service in the Channel. She was refitted at Deptford from March to July 1720 at a cost of £1,993.19.8d. She was surveyed on 13 November 1724.

Rebuild at Deptford 1725 - 1727
She was dismantled at Deptford in preparation for rebuilding as a 374 tom 20-gun sixth rate. Her rebuild commenced in January 1725 with her launching on 8 August 1727. The tonnage calculation would be 37466/94 tons. The gun armament as established in 1713 would be twenty 6-pounder 19 hundredweight (cwt) guns mounted on wooden trucks. She was completed for sea on 2 September 1727 at a cost of £6,723.16.4d.

Commissioned Service after Rebuild
She was commissioned in 1728 under the command of Captain John Byng, RN In July 1728 she was under the command of Captain John Stanley, RN for Wager's Fleet in the straits, then moved to the Mediterranean. In 1752 Captain Henry Medley was in command for secret service in 1732 then to Maryland in 1733 and then to the Barbary Coast in 1734. She underwent a middling repair and refitted at Sheerness for £1,181.10.4d from March to May 1735. After completion, she was commissioned under Captain John Durell, RN for service in the English Channel. In 1736, Captain Richard Norris took cammand for Tagus and then to the Mediterranean. Upon her return she underwent a middling repair at Portsmouth for £4,296.5.5d from May thru October 1740. She recommissioned in July 1740 under Captain Purvis, RN. Captain George Cokburne, RN took command in June 1741 and was off Oporto, followed by Captain Thorp Fowke, RN in May 1742 for the North Sea and Captain Philip Durell, RN took command in 1743. She was to have ben fitted for service in the West Indies but this was cancelled. She underwent a small repair at Sheerness costing £2,371.1.5d between December 1743 and January 1744. Captain Richard Chadwick, RN took command in January 1744 for service in the North sea followed by Captain Coningsby Norbury, RN in November 1744 and Captain John Barker in September 1745. November 1746 she was in the Thames approaches under Captain Frederick Hyde, RN. Between October 1747 and February 1748 she underwent a middling repair at Sheerness for £2,167.18.8d. She was paid off in July 1748 and underwent a survey on 13 December 1748.

Disposition
HMS Gibraltar was sold by Admiralty Order (AO) 23 December 1748 for £340 on 16 March 1749.

Notes

Citations

References
 Winfield 2009, British Warships in the Age of Sail (1603 – 1714), by Rif Winfield, published by Seaforth Publishing, England © 2009, EPUB , Chapter 6, The Sixth Rates, Vessels acquired from 2 May 1660, Gibraltar Group, Gibraltar
 Winfield 2007, British Warships in the Age of Sail (1714 – 1792), by Rif Winfield, published by Seaforth Publishing, England © 2007, EPUB , Chapter 6, Sixth Rates, Sixth Rates of 20 or 24 guns, Vessels in Service at 1 August 1714, Gibraltar Group, Gibraltar
 Colledge, Ships of the Royal Navy, by J.J. Colledge, revised and updated by Lt Cdr Ben Warlow and Steve Bush, published by Seaforth Publishing, Barnsley, Great Britain, © 2020, EPUB , (EPUB), Section G (Gibraltar)

 

1710s ships
Corvettes of the Royal Navy
Ships built in Portsmouth
Naval ships of the United Kingdom